Eddie Flood (born 9 November 1952 in Liverpool) is a footballer who played as left back for Tranmere Rovers and York City.

References

1952 births
Living people
Footballers from Liverpool
Association football fullbacks
English footballers
Liverpool F.C. players
Tranmere Rovers F.C. players
York City F.C. players
English Football League players